Henry "Harry" Campbell (6 June 1867 – 15 November 1915) was a Scottish footballer who played in the Football League for Blackburn Rovers. He was the first man to win both the Scottish Cup (in 1888 with hometown club Renton, where he also won the unofficial 'World Championship' and two Glasgow Merchants Charity Cups) and the English FA Cup (in 1890 with Blackburn).

Campbell played once for Scotland in 1889, a short time before his move to Lancashire along with compatriots Geordie Dewar and Tom Brandon in a Rovers recruitment drive north of the border (this meant they would not be selected by Scotland, a situation which did not change until 1896). He missed out on a possible second FA Cup medal in 1891 due to contracting pneumonia.

References

Sources

1867 births
1915 deaths
Scottish footballers
Blackburn Rovers F.C. players
English Football League players
Renton F.C. players
Scotland international footballers
Association football inside forwards
FA Cup Final players
Footballers from West Dunbartonshire
People from Renton, West Dunbartonshire